Chelsea, formerly known as Winnisimmet by the Naumkeag tribe, is a city in Suffolk County, Massachusetts, United States, directly across the Mystic River from Boston. As of the 2020 census, Chelsea had a population of 40,787. With a total area of just 2.46 square miles, Chelsea is the smallest city in Massachusetts in terms of total area. It is  the second most densely populated city in Massachusetts, behind Somerville, and is the city with the second-highest percentage of Latino residents in Massachusetts, behind Lawrence.

History

The area of Chelsea was first called Winnisimmet possibly meaning "good spring nearby" or "swamp hill" by the Naumkeag tribe, who lived there for thousands of years prior to European colonization in the 1600s. Samuel Maverick became the first European to settle permanently in Winnisimmet in 1624 and his palisaded trading post is considered the first permanent settlement by Boston Harbor. In 1635, Maverick sold all of Winnisimmet, except for his house and farm, to Richard Bellingham. The community remained part of Boston until it was set off and incorporated in 1739, when it was named after Chelsea, a neighborhood in London, England.

In 1775, the Battle of Chelsea Creek was fought in the area, the second battle of the Revolution, at which American forces made one of their first captures of a British ship. Part of George Washington's army was stationed in Chelsea during the Siege of Boston.

On February 22, 1841, part of Chelsea was annexed by Saugus, Massachusetts. On March 19, 1846, North Chelsea, which consists of present-day Revere and Winthrop, was established as a separate town. Reincorporated as a city in 1857, Chelsea developed as an industrial center and by mid-century had become a powerhouse in wooden sailing ship construction. As the century wore on, steam power began to overtake the age of the sail and industry in the town began to shift toward manufacturing. Factories making rubber and elastic goods, boots and shoes, stoves, and adhesives began to appear along the banks of Boston Harbor. It became home to the Chelsea Naval Hospital designed by Alexander Parris and home for soldiers.

According to local historical records, Nathan Morse, the first Jewish resident of Chelsea, arrived in 1864, and by 1890 there were only 82 Jews living in the city. However, Chelsea was a major destination for the "great wave" of Russian and Eastern European immigrants, especially Russian Jews, who came to the United States after 1890. By 1910 the number of Jews had grown to 11,225, nearly one third of the entire population of the city. In the 1930s there were about 20,000 Jewish residents in Chelsea out of a total population of almost 46,000. Given the area of the city, Chelsea may well have had the most Jewish residents per square mile of any city outside of New York City.

On April 12, 1908, nearly half the city was destroyed in the first of two great fires that would devastate Chelsea in the 20th century. The fire left 18,000 people, 56 percent of the population, homeless. Despite the magnitude of the destruction, it would only take the city about two and a half years to rebuild and five years to surpass the extent of 1908's infrastructure. The city was also laid out differently after the fire, with wider streets and more access for emergency vehicles. Many of the city's residents left and never returned, which opened the door for many immigrants living in Boston to "move up" to Chelsea. To immigrants living in crowded tenements in Boston's West End, East and South Ends, Chelsea was the next stop on their path of economic upward mobility.

By 1919 Chelsea's population had reached the record level of 52,662, with foreign-born residents comprising 46 percent of the population. Fully transitioned from a suburb to an industrial city, the waterfront flourished, with shipbuilding, lumberyards, metalworks and paint companies lined Marginal Street.

Between 1940 and 1980, the population declined by 38 percent. Chelsea lost more population than other urban areas after the 1950s because of the construction of the elevated Northeast Expressway built to connect the North Shore suburbs to Boston, via the Mystic River Bridge (later renamed for Boston Mayor Maurice J. Tobin). Hundreds of homes were lost to make way for the expressway as it cut the city in half. The resulting out-migration took with it many small, local businesses. Historic homes were abandoned, along with industrial buildings, brownfields, salt piles and gas storage tanks dotting the cityscape.

In 1973, disaster struck again when the Second Great Chelsea Fire burned 18 city blocks, leaving nearly a fifth of the city in ashes. Both fires originated in Chelsea's "rag shop district," cluttered streets filled with junk shops hawking scraps, metal, and combustible items. Wood-frame buildings and three- to six-family houses were built tightly together, and quickly caught fire.

By 1990, Chelsea had collapsed economically and socially. Crime was rampant, even among the police and local government officials. The population drain made way for more immigrants, but depleted the city's tax base. The cost of running the city and maintaining its infrastructure did not decrease correspondingly so, in 1991, the city suffered fiscal collapse.

The Commonwealth of Massachusetts enacted special legislation to place Chelsea into receivership. For the first time since the Great Depression, a Massachusetts city surrendered home rule and allowed a state-appointed receiver to control all aspects of city government. Governor William Weld named James Carlin as the first receiver followed by Lewis "Harry" Spence. City Hall was eviscerated, the police and fire departments reorganized, management of the public schools given to Boston University, and indictments handed down. Mayor John "Butchie" Brennan and two former mayors were found guilty of federal crimes.

By the summer of 1995, when the state returned City Hall to the people of Chelsea, a new government had been born, brought to life by a panel of citizens charged with drafting a new city charter. The new charter eliminated the position of mayor, converting management of the city from a mayor to a council–manager government system, where a city manager is selected by City Council members. As such, municipal government focused on improving the quality of services provided to residents and businesses, while establishing financial policies that have significantly improved the city's financial condition. With their leaders more accountable and efficient, Chelsea reversed its long decline and entered a period of population growth and economic development.

Geography

Located on a small peninsula in Boston Harbor covering a mere , Chelsea is the smallest city by area in Massachusetts. Chelsea is bordered on three sides by water. The Mystic River borders Chelsea to the southwest, the Chelsea Creek and Mill Creek and the Island End River border it to the west.

The topography of Chelsea consists primarily of coastal lowlands, punctuated by four drumlins formed during the last Ice Age. These drumlins are located in the southwest (Admirals Hill), southeast (Mount Bellingham), northeast (Powderhorn Hill) and northwest (Mount Washington). A smaller drumlin (Mill Hill) is located on the east side of Chelsea, adjacent to Mill Creek. This sloped and hilly landscape helps to divide the city into discernible neighborhoods, each with its own character, thereby giving the city a manageable sense of scale and orientation.

Neighborhoods and districts
Despite its small size, there are several distinct neighborhoods in Chelsea:

Admirals Hill: Admirals Hill sits atop a point of land between the Mystic River and Island End River. Containing the Naval Hospital Historic District, the area is mostly residential development enjoying expansive views. On the south slope of the hill is the site of the historic Chelsea Naval Hospital, with several brick and granite structures that have been converted to other uses. Between the Naval Hospital and the shoreline is the Mary O'Malley Park, the largest public park in Chelsea.

Addison-Orange: Adjacent to the north side of downtown, the Addison-Orange neighborhood is residential, flat and densely populated. Washington Avenue runs through this neighborhood.

Bellingham Square: This historic district became the center of commerce and government after the 1908 fire. The cohesiveness of design is the result of community planning after the Great Fire of 1908. The district includes City Hall, modeled after Old Independence Hall in Philadelphia, the Public Library and Phoenix Charter Academy's campus.

Box District: Just over a block from City Hall, this once blighted neighborhood gets its name from various box manufacturing companies that operated in the area as early as 1903, when the Russell Box Company began operations at the foot of Gerrish Avenue. Abandoned in the 1960s, the area fell into disrepair until it was rezoned for residential use in the 2000s. It is now the fastest-growing part of Chelsea and has enjoyed a building boom since 2005, with town homes and multifamily housing complexes proliferating in the area.

Carter Park—Wyndham Area: The neighborhood around Carter Park is a small enclave of mostly single-family Queen Anne style homes surrounded by heavy commercial and highly trafficked areas. Route 1 looms above the southeastern edge of this tree-lined neighborhood, and Revere Beach Parkway winds along the northern edge. The Chelsea High School, Floramos, Wyndham Hotel, Boston's FBI regional field office, MGH Healthcare Center, and Mystic Mall (Market Basket, TJ Maxx, Home Goods, Five Guys) are located in this area. The historic Chelsea Clock Company used to be located in this area until 2015.

Chelsea Square: This historic district located in the downtown area contains the finest and most intact grouping of mid 19th and early 20th century commercial architecture in the city. Area includes a waterfront district (South Broadway neighborhood) with brick row houses dating to the mid to late 19th century. Third Street is also in the area, becoming the industrial Everett Avenue. The Chelsea Police Department is located here.

Chelsea Commons: Formerly known as Parkway Plaza, Chelsea Commons sits on a low flat area near the end of Mill Creek, part of which was on a former landfill and clay pit. The plaza consists of big-box retail, fast-food restaurants, and two large apartment buildings. It is bordered by a strip of wetlands on both sides. Webster Ave, Mill Creek Riverwalk, Creekside Common, and Beth Israel Deaconess HealthCare.

Mill Hill: This largely residential area consists mostly of two- and three-story wood frame detached buildings. Covering the smallest of the city's drumlins, the Mill Hill neighborhood sits on a small neck of land bounded by Chelsea Creek and Mill Creek. This neighborhood is on the Revere line. Eastern Avenue goes through his neighborhood.

Prattville: Is the northwestern section of the city. It also borders Revere and Everett to the west. Pizza Lovers, Washington Park, Voke Park, and The Newbridge Cafe are located in this area. Metro Credit Union and McDonald's have a large presence there as well. Next to these chains is another, smaller Chelsea Firefighter station. Garfield and Washington Avenues are in Prattville. Route 1 is on the east side of Prattville, and Route 16 is on the south side.

Soldiers Home: The Soldiers Home neighborhood covers the steep slopes and the peak of Powderhorn Hill. This residential area contains some examples of Queen Anne style architecture. Soldiers Home is one of the least dense neighborhoods in the city. At the peak sits the Soldiers Home, a large structure that dominates much of this area. However, there are some smaller associated brick structures in the area as well as Malone Park.

Waterfront District: For the first time, Chelsea is breaking through the heavy industry piled up along the Chelsea Creek, and reconnecting with its waterfront. Established to promote water-oriented industrial uses at Forbes Industrial Park and the lower Chelsea Creek waterfront, its use remains primarily industrial. Most of the waterfront from the Tobin Bridge to the mouth of Mill Creek is a Designated Port Area (DPA), and Chelsea has in the last decade embraced it. The city is encouraging industry to move in, but only if they help finance a new park on the waterfront.

Demographics

Statistics

As of the 2010 United States Census, there were 35,177 people, 11,888 households, and 7,614 families residing in the city. The racial makeup of the city was 47.8% White, 8.5% Black or African American, 3.1% Asian, 1.1% Native American, 0.09% Pacific Islander, 33.6% from other races, and 5.9% were multiracial. In addition, 62.1% of residents identified as Hispanic or Latino (of any race), which includes 18.2% Salvadoran, 12.7% Puerto Rican, 8.4% Honduran, 7.3% Guatemalan, 2.8% Mexican,  2.2% Dominican, 0.5% Cuban, 0.5% Costa Rican, 0.4% Nicaraguan, 0.4% Panamanian, 1.4% other Central American countries, 2.5% other South American countries, 5.3% other Hispanic/Latino.

There were 11,888 households, out of which 36.4% had children under the age of 18 living with them, 36.9% were married couples living together, 20.1% had a female householder with no husband present, and 36% were non-families. Of all households 28.8% were made up of individuals, and 10.8% had someone living alone who was 65 years of age or older. The average household size was 2.87 and the average family size was 3.5.

The population was spread out, with 27.3 under the age of 18, 10.6% from 18 to 24, 34.6% from 25 to 44, 16.3% from 45 to 64, and 11.2% who were 65 years of age or older. The median age was 31 years. For every 100 females, there were 100.9 males. For every 100 females age 18 and over, there were 99.7 males.

The median income for a household in the city was $30,161, and the median income for a family was $32,130. Males had a median income of $27,280 versus $26,010 for females. The per capita income for the city was $14,628. About 20.6% of families and 23.3% of the population were below the poverty line, including 28.8% of those under age 18 and 20.9% of those age 65 or over.

Foreign-born population
In 2010, 38% of Chelsea residents had been born outside of the United States. This is the highest percentage of foreign-born residents in the Commonwealth of Massachusetts.

Within recent years, the city has made a sustained effort to work with both immigrant communities and persons of minority faiths. Its "Interfaith Alliance" brings members of the Jewish, Christian, and Muslim communities together to promote inclusiveness, diversity, and tolerance. And its continued loyalty to its 2007 Sanctuary City Resolution aims to support all foreign born residents regardless of their country of origin or immigration status.

Government

Local

Economy

Top employers
According to Chelsea's 2012 Comprehensive Annual Financial Report, the top employers in the city are:

Economic development
Under City Manager Ambrosino, Chelsea has implemented several innovative data analysis and tracking programs. Many of these programs are led and administered in conjunction with fellows from the Harvard Kennedy School's Innovation Field Lab. According to Chelsea's 2017 "State of the City" report, "this partnership allows the city to benefit from the questions and suggestions of [domestic and] international graduate students."

These data analysis programs have played a particularly helpful role in the city's efforts to "revitalize" the downtown area around Bellingham Square via the "Re-Imagining Broadway" initiative. In 2016, the City Council approved a $5.2 million grant for infrastructure improvements in the district. The project has been supported by a newly hired Downtown Coordinator and aims to engage residents and local businesses in a collective effort to advance the economic prosperity and quality of life in the district.

Since the beginning of 2017 City officials kicked off Reimagining Broadway as a way to improve the downtown streets for motorists, pedestrians, and public transit. 
On July 23, 2019, the Baker-Polito Administration announced the expansion of the Transformative Development Initiative (TDI), a MassDevelopment program for Gateway Cities designed to accelerate economic growth within focused districts. Lt. Governor Karyn Polito made the announcement with MassDevelopment President and CEO Lauren Liss, New Bedford Mayor Jon Mitchell, and members of the New Bedford legislative delegation at the WHALE Co-Creative Center in New Bedford. "Our administration is pleased to further expand this program, which represents an innovative, block-by-block approach to revitalizing local economies." said Governor Charlie Baker.

Chelsea has been engaging businesses and residents in the Broadway Central Business District encouraging them to participate in economic development programs such as "Re-Imagining Broadway" and "Chelsea Centro". The project includes design and parking studies of the corridor from Chelsea Square through Bellingham Square to Fay Square.  Over the next several years the corridor will be reconstructed to enhance public safety, enable businesses to thrive, and make downtown Chelsea a place where more people want to be.

There are other similar projects like "Commonwealth Places" a collaborative initiative from MassDevelopment and the civic crowdfunding platform Patronicity, and "The Chelsea Business Foundation" are in progress and scheduled for spring/summer 2020.

Capital Improvement Plan
As summarized by the "State of the City" report, Chelsea's Capital Improvement Plan will invest in "park development, building improvements, water and sewer upgrades, and neighborhood street/sidewalks improvements. Other specific investments in new graffiti removal and snow removal equipment will enhance the quality of life for residents." The expenditures for Fiscal Year 2018 and Fiscal Year 2018–2022 can be found to the right. Total expenditures are divided between utility enhancement, equipment acquisition, parks and open space, public buildings and facilities, public safety, and surface enhancement. For Fiscal Year 2018, almost 64% of the budget will be dedicated to surface enhancements, which includes citywide sidewalks, marginal street pre-engineering, Shurtleff Street roadway and sidewalks, casino mitigation/transportation, citywide traffic calming, Congress Avenue road and sidewalks, Downtown Broadway engineering and construction, and Highland Street Greenway Phase II.

Residential development
Housing Composition: According to the 2011–2015 Community Survey, there are a total of 12,940 households in Chelsea, 27.9% of which are owner-occupied and 72.1% of which are renter-occupied. Although Chelsea has been known as the "City of Renters", there has been a push for home ownership. This has been pushed in particular by the Chelsea Restoration Corporation, which offers educational housing workshops and works in partnership with other state, municipal, and private partners to "rehabilitate properties and increase the stock of affordable housing."

Heating: Over half (55.4%) of the housing units in Chelsea use utility gas, 29.8% use electricity, 12.7% use fuel oil, kerosene, etc. and smaller portion (2.1%) of housing units use bottled, tank, or LP gas, as well as other fuel or no fuel at all. With these statistics in mind, Chelsea has started several initiatives towards renewable energy and sustainability. One includes a partnership with SolSmart, a team of individuals dedicated to implementation of Solar energy, by making solar panels accessible through zoning laws, offering affordable solar options and providing education and resources for those who are interested in these efforts.

Reimagine Broadway
Reimagine Broadway was a six-month long planning effort that began in 2017 to transform downtown Chelsea, with the guidance of the Chelsea City Council, City Manager Ambrosino, Planning and Developing Downtown Coordinator Mimi Graney and several others. This effort ranges from supporting small business owners to re-designing the streetscape. The goals of this project were to "Enhance how public space is used and accessed downtown, support existing businesses and encourage new growth, beautify the area and create a consistent, vibrant look, improve overall safety for all users, establish a circulation pattern that works for cars, buses, pedestrians, transit riders, and bicyclists."

Transportation

Roads
The Route 1 North Expressway is a limited access highway that cuts City of Chelsea in half. The Tobin Bridge, a major regional transportation artery, carries Route 1 from Chelsea across the Mystic River to Charlestown.

Train
Chelsea is served by the Massachusetts Bay Transit Authority's Commuter Rail. The Commuter Rail provides service from Boston's North Station with the Chelsea station on its Newburyport/Rockport Line. Chelsea does not have a link to the MBTA subway or light rail systems.

Bus

Chelsea is served by many MBTA bus routes providing local service to East Boston, Revere, Everett, and other nearby cities as well as bus rapid transit connections to Logan Airport and downtown Boston via the MBTA's Silver Line.

The Silver Line's SL3 route to Chelsea has been in operation since 2018. The new SL3 route begins at South Station and runs through the Waterfront Tunnel, along with the SL1 and SL2 routes, to Silver Line Way, continuing with the SL1 through the Ted Williams Tunnel. The new route diverges to meet the Blue Line at Airport Station, and follows the Coughlin Bypass Road (a half-mile commercial-use-only road which opened in 2012) to the Chelsea Street Bridge. The Silver Line stops at the four stations in Chelsea: Eastern Avenue, Box District, Downtown Chelsea, and Mystic Mall. A new $20 million Chelsea commuter rail station and "transit hub" was constructed at the Mystic Mall terminus of the new Silver Line route, so that trains no longer block Sixth Street. The new Silver Line and commuter rail stations are fully handicapped accessible.

Additionally, a multi-use  shared path  linear park runs parallel to the Silver Line bus rapid transit busway utilizing the Boston & Albany Railroad's Grand Junction Branch right-of-way. Located within the Box District neighborhood, the path connects Downtown Chelsea and Eastern Avenue stations.

Education
Chelsea Public Schools has four elementary schools, three middle schools, and one high school, Chelsea High School. The Chelsea school system has historically been towards the bottom of the state's test score rankings. It is plagued by high turnover among students. A very high percentage of students move in or out over the course of the year, and the dropout rate is high. In 1988, the school board made the unprecedented move of delegating its authority for control of the school district to Boston University. In June 2008, a partnership with BU ended, and the schools returned to full local control.

Chelsea has no private schools remaining with St. Rose closing in June 2020. In addition, there are two public charter schools, the Excel Academy and Phoenix Charter Academy. Bunker Hill Community College and the for-profit Everest Institute have satellite locations of their schools in Chelsea.

Fire department

The city of Chelsea is protected by the career professional firefighters of the City of Chelsea Fire Department, operating from three fire stations across the city, each shift commanded by a Deputy Chief. Chelsea Fire operates an apparatus fleet of four engines, two ladders, two special operations units, a maintenance unit, a foam-tender unit, and several other special, support, and reserve units. Chelsea Fire responds to ~11,000 emergency calls annually. As of April 2019, the Chief of Department was Leonard A. Albanese, who accepted the job in 2016, after serving as Fire Chief of the North Providence Fire Department. He succeeded Acting Chief Robert Houghton, who had taken on that role while former Chief of Department Robert Better was on medical leave; Better retired in January 2015.

Sites of interest

Historic places
Chelsea has eight places on the National Register of Historic Places.

Chelsea Clock Company
Founded in 1897, the Chelsea Clock Company is one of the oldest, largest, and few remaining American clock manufacturing companies in existence. For over a century, Chelsea's clockmakers have been designing and handcrafting distinguished, high quality clocks for customers in the corporate, consumer, government and marine markets. In 2015, the Chelsea Clock Company moved to a smaller building a few blocks away from the original location. Today, the company continues to build and repair clocks from its new headquarters. The old building is slated for demolition to make way for a new apartment building.

Open space

Notable people

 Horatio Alger, author
 Miguel La Fay Bardi, Roman Catholic Prelate of the Territorial Prelature of Sicuani (1999–2013)
 Richard Bellingham, governor of the Massachusetts Bay Colony
 Tom Birmingham, former President of the Massachusetts Senate
 Raymond W. Bliss, Army surgeon general
 Selma Botman, President of the University of Southern Maine
 Ian Bremmer, Political scientist and founder of Eurasia Group
 Alfred Winsor Brown, 31st Naval Governor of Guam
 William Bryden, U.S. Army major general
 Vannevar Bush, Raytheon Company Co-founder
 Chick Corea, jazz musician
 Norman Cota, United States Army general
 Albert DeSalvo, Boston Strangler
 Win Elliot, sportscaster and game show host
 Anna Christy Fall (1855–1930), lawyer
 Jack Harvey, member of the Wisconsin State Assembly
 Ray Hyman, Professor Emeritus of Psychology at the University of Oregon, author, magician and a noted critic of parapsychology
 Brian Kelly, Notre Dame Fighting Irish head football coach
 Isaac Pendleton Langworthy, American Congregational minister and librarian
 Lewis Howard Latimer, scientist and inventor
 Samuel Maverick, colonist
 Howard B. Meek, educator at Cornell University
 Charles E. Mitchell, banker
 Jim Mutrie, baseball pioneer
 Joseph C. O'Mahoney, United States Senator from Wyoming
 Marion Osgood, violinist, orchestra leader, composer
 Daniel Pratt, author and eccentric
 Belle Yeaton Renfrew, trombonist and conductor
 Harris S. Richardson, former President of the Massachusetts Senate
 Annette Rogers, sprinter and Olympic gold medalist
 John Ruiz, heavyweight boxing champion
 Joe Smith (music industry executive)
 Arnold Stang, actor, known for films such as The Man with the Golden Arm and It's a Mad, Mad, Mad, Mad World
 Elizabeth Cady Stanton, American social activist, abolitionist, and leading figure of the early women's rights movement
 Michelle Tea, author, poet, and literary arts organizer, co-founder of lesbian-feminist performance art collective based in San Francisco
 Carl Voss, National Hockey League Hall of Famer
 Wenepoykin, last sachem of the Naumkeag people
 John Raimondi, renowned American sculptor and art collector.

See also
 List of mayors of Chelsea, Massachusetts

References

Further reading
 Chamberlain, Mellen (1908). A documentary history of Chelsea: including the Boston precincts of Winnisimmet, Rumney Marsh, and Pullen Point, 1624–1824. Boston: Massachusetts Historical Society.

External links

 Official website
 Chelsea Historical Society
 Chelsea Chamber of Commerce

 
1624 establishments in Massachusetts
Cities in Massachusetts
Cities in Suffolk County, Massachusetts
Hispanic and Latino American culture in Massachusetts
Historic Jewish communities in the United States
Populated coastal places in Massachusetts
Populated places established in 1624
Russian communities in the United States